is a Japanese design concept involving the play and placement of light and dark elements as they are placed next to the other in the composition of art and imagery.

Uses
This use of light and dark translates shape and form into flat shapes on a two-dimensional surface. Nōtan is traditionally presented in paint, ink, or cut paper, but it is relevant to a host of modern-day image-making techniques, such as lithography in printmaking, and rotoscoping in animation.

See also
 Negative space
Gestalt psychology
Yin and yang

References
Composition: A Series of Exercises in Art Structure for the Use of Students and teachers  by Arthur Wesley Dow (1899)(1855)
Notan: A Virtual Art Academy building block by Barry John Raybould, MA (2004/2010) Course on Notan
Notan: The Dark-Light Principle of Design by Dorr Bothwell and Marlys Mayfield (1968/1991)
The Interaction of Color by Josef Albers (1963)
Perception and Imaging by Richard D. Zakia (1997/2001)

External links
 Notan: Design in Light and Dark by Sharon Himes
 A guide to Notan: The What Why and How
 Notan – What It Is And How To Use It In Art

Japanese art
Design
Painting techniques